Marinus II was the second dux of Fondi after his father, Marinus I. He is an ancestor of the Caetani.

Dukes of Italy
House of Caetani